The Băldal (also: Jivan) is a right tributary of the river Desnățui in Romania. It flows into the Desnățui near Cerăt.

References

Rivers of Romania
Rivers of Dolj County